The Church of Scotland Yearbook (known informally as the Red Book because of its red binding) is a collection of statistical data published annually by the Church of Scotland.

It contains contact information for every minister, as well as contact details for the church offices, clerks, and general personnel.

It also contains congregational statistics for every parish in the Church of Scotland, and gives the following information:

Number of communicants
Number of elders
Membership numbers of the Church of Scotland Guild
Parish's income
Number of young people (under the age of eighteen)

Church of Scotland
Yearbooks
Social statistics data
Demographics of Scotland